"Nëntori" is a song by Albanian singer Arilena Ara. The song was entirely written by Albanian musician Lindon Berisha and produced by Macedonian producer Darko Dimitrov. It was primarily composed for Arilena's participation in the 18th edition of Kënga Magjike.

The song experienced commercial success in Romania peaking at number one on the country's Radio and TV Airplay Charts. Two remixed versions of the song by Bess and Beverly Pills respectively entered the charts in Russia and Ukraine. For further promotion, it was performed by the singer on various occasions among others in Albania, Kazakhstan, Romania, Russia and Ukraine.

Background and composition 

"Nëntori" was written by Albanian musician Lindon Berisha and produced by Macedonian producer Darko Dimitrov. Lasting four minutes and seven seconds, the song is a ballad which musically incorporates ethnic beats, oriental elements and violins in its instrumentation. It is lyrically about a love story between two separated people that reflects pain and tears.

Promotion 

An English version of "Nëntori" with the title "I'm Sorry", written by Menno Reyntjes, was premiered onto the YouTube channel of Arilena with an accompanying music video on 24 August 2017. For further promotion, Arilena performed the song in the Europa Plus Festival, Astana Dusy Festival and FIFA Fan Zone Moscow. She made further appearances to perform the song on Romanian radio station Radio ZU on 14 June 2017. On 15 December 2017, she was invited to perform the song in the grand final on the Romanian television talent show Voice of Romania.

Kënga Magjike  

The 18th edition of Kënga Magjike took place in Tirana, Albania, and consisted of two semi-finals held on 7 and 8 December, and the grand final on 10 December 2016. Arilena Ara, one of the contestants selected to compete in the competition, performed the song for the first time on 14 November 2016 as well as on 10 December 2016 after qualifying for the grand final. The song reached the third place in a field of twenty-one in the grand final onf 10 December 2016 and won the nomination for the Best Ballad.

Charts

Weekly charts

Monthly charts

Year-end charts

Release history

See also 
 List of Airplay 100 number ones of the 2010s

References 

2010s ballads
2016 singles
2016 songs  
Arilena Ara songs
Albanian-language songs
Kënga Magjike songs
Song recordings produced by Darko Dimitrov
Songs written by Lindon Berisha
Number-one singles in Romania